Camber may refer to a variety of curvatures and angles:
 Camber angle, the angle made by the wheels of a vehicle
 Camber beam, an upward curvature of a joist to compensate for load deflection due in buildings
 Camber thrust in bike technology
 Camber (aerodynamics), the asymmetry between the top and bottom curves of an aerofoil
 Camber (ship), a measure of transversal deck curvature in naval architecture
 Cant (road/rail), the convex curvature of a road surface in road construction
 The curvature of a bow used to play certain string instruments, or the curvature of the fingerboard

Camber may also refer to:
 Camber (band), an emo band from New York
 Camber (legendary king), legendary king of Cambria, Wales
 Camber Corporation, a defense contractor in Huntsville, Alabama
 Camber, East Sussex, a seaside village including Camber Sands beach in England
 Camber, the former name of Mihai Bravu, Tulcea, Romania
 Camber of Culdi, a prominent character in the fictional series of Deryni novels
 NATO reporting name for the Ilyushin Il-86 airliner
 Cambering (geology), the downslope movement of competent strata into a valley